The Kamov Ka-26 (NATO reporting name Hoodlum) is a Soviet light utility helicopter with co-axial rotors.

Development
The Ka-26 entered production in 1969 and 816 were built. A variant with a single turboshaft engine is the Ka-126. A twin-turboshaft–powered version is the Ka-226. (All the Ka-26/126/128/226 variants are code-named by NATO as "Hoodlum").

Design
The fuselage of the Ka-26 consists of a fixed, bubble-shaped cockpit containing the pilot and co-pilot, plus a removable, variable box available in medevac, passenger-carrying and crop duster versions. The helicopter can fly with or without the box attached for flexibility.

It is powered by two 325 hp (239 kW) Vedeneyev M-14V-26 radial engines mounted in outboard nacelles.

The Ka-26 is small enough to land on a large truck bed. The reciprocating engines are more responsive than turboshaft engines, but require more maintenance. It runs mostly at 95% power in crop dusting with usually excess payload, leaving little reserve power for emergencies. Due to frequent overloads, the interconnect shaft joining the two engines is prone to breakage and requires frequent inspection.

The standard instrumentation of the Ka-26, like larger naval Kamovs, may be overkill for civilian or crop dusting use. The 18-dials cockpit panel masks a part of the right-downwards view, needed to avoid telephone and power lines at low altitudes. The instrument panel may be simplified to retain the six main dials. As there is a low rotor clearance at the aircraft front, it is approached from the rear when the rotors are turning.

Due to the limitations of the Ka-26, USSR and Romania agreed under the Comecon trade to build a single-turboshaft engine version, the Kamov Ka-126, with better aerodynamics and range.

Operational history
The Ka-26 was used by some Warsaw Pact armies in the light paratroop or airborne role, but its slow (150 km/h) cruise speed compared with the Mil-2 (220 km/h) limits its military use.  However, its shorter length (7.75 m) compared with the Mil Mi-2 (11.9 m) and smaller rotor diameter (13 m vs. 14.6 m) are advantageous when operating in an urban area. It has a longer range than the Mil-2 as well. The Ka-26 is eminently useful for crop dusting. The coaxial main rotor configuration, which makes the Ka-26 small and agile, also results in a delicate airflow pattern under the helicopter, providing a thorough, yet mild distribution of chemicals onto plants. The Ka-26 is often used to spray grape farms in Hungary, where conventional "main rotor and tail rotor" layout helicopters would damage or up-root the vine-stocks with their powerful airflow. Hungarian Kamov operators claim that coaxial rotors of the Ka-26 creates an airflow which allows pesticides to settle underneath, rather than on top of, the leaves, this means a much more effective distribution of pesticides, as most pests and parasites do not live on the top side of foliage. Additionally, the coaxial vortex system is symmetrical, allowing the distribution of the pesticide to be more uniform.

On 30 June 2020, Moldovan police and prosecutors closed down an illegal factory producing unlicensed copies of the Ka-26. The factory had a production line with ten air frames in various stages of completion that were intended for sale to clients in former Soviet countries.

Variants
Ka-26 Hoodlum-A
One- or two-crew utility light helicopter, powered by two 325-hp (239-kW) VMK (Vedeneyev) M-14V-26 radial engines. 850 built.
Ka-26SS
NOTAR technology testbed for the Ka-118 fitted with tail jet beams.
Ka-126 Hoodlum-B
One- or two-crew utility light helicopter, powered by one 720-shp (537-kW) OMKB "Mars" (Glushenkov) TVD-100 turboshaft engine. First flown in 1986, built and developed by Industria Aeronautică Română in Romania. 2 prototypes and 15 series helicopter built.
V-60 
A prototype light armed escort helicopter based on the Ka-126.
Ka-128
One prototype, powered by a 722-shp (538-kW) Turbomeca Arriel 1D1 turboshaft engine.
Kamov Ka-226 
Six- or seven-seat utility helicopter, powered by two 450-shp (335-kW) Rolls-Royce (Allison ) 250-C20R/2 turboshaft engines.

Operators

 Gazpromavia

 West Copter

Former operators

Bulgarian Air Force
 
Volkspolizei

Mongolian Air Force

Lithuanian State Border Guard Service

Hungarian Air Force

Sri Lanka Air Force

Specifications (Ka-26)

See also

References

 Taylor, John W. R. Jane's All The World's Aircraft 1982–83. London:Jane's Yearbooks, 1982. .

External links

 https://web.archive.org/web/20020525031818/http://kamov.ru/
 https://web.archive.org/web/19991010165536/http://www.aviation.ru/Ka/#26
 https://web.archive.org/web/20160415012400/http://www.kamov.net/kamov-civilian/kamov-ka-126/
 Picture of the Kamov Ka-26 aircraft – Airliners.net
 Symmetrical vortices

Kamov aircraft
1960s Soviet civil utility aircraft
1960s Soviet military utility aircraft
Kamov Ka-026
Soviet and Russian agricultural aircraft
Coaxial rotor helicopters
Aircraft first flown in 1965
Twin-engined piston helicopters